Count of Teba is a hereditary title in the Peerage of Spain, granted in 1522 by Charles I to Diego Ramírez de Guzmán, son of the 1st Lord of Teba. The name makes reference to the municipality of Teba, in Málaga, Spain.

The Teba jacket, a popular country attire, was named after the countship, as the 21st Count of Teba would popularize the garment during the 1920s.

Counts of Teba (1522)

Diego Ramírez de Guzmán y Ponce de León, 1st Count of Teba (b. 1450)
Luis de Guzmán y Córdoba, 2nd Count of Teba (b. 1475), son of the 1st Count
Juan Ramírez de Guzmán y Álvarez de Toledo, 3rd Count of Teba (b. 1510), son of the 2nd Count
Brianda de Guzmán y de la Vega, 4th Countess of Teba (b. 1500), daughter of the 2nd Count
Luis de Guzmán y Guzmán, 5th Count of Teba (b. 1530), son of the 4th Countess
Pedro Andrés de Guzmán Enríquez de Rivera y Acuña, 6th Count of Teba (b. 1580), son of the 5th Count
Luis Francisco Ramírez de Guzmán y Fernández de Córdoba, 7th Count of Teba (b. 1620), son of the 6th Count
Pedro de Guzmán y Portocarrero, 8th Count of Teba (d. 1681), son of the 7th Count
Agustín de Guzmán y Portocarrero, 9th Count of Teba (d. 1681), brother of the 8th Count
Inés de Guzmán y Fernández de Córdoba, 10th Countess of Teba (1615-1681), daughter of the 5th Count
Cristóbal Portocarrero de Guzmán Henriquez de Luna, 11th Count of Teba (1638-1704), son of the 10th Countess
Catalina Portocarrero de Guzmán, 12th Countess of Teba (1660-1712), granddaughter of the 9th Count
Domingo Fernández de Córdoba, 13th Count of Teba (d. 1736), son of the 12th Countess
María del Carmen Fernández de Córdoba, 14th Countess of Teba (b. 1725), daughter of the 13th Count
Luis Fernández de Córdoba y Portocarrero, 15th Count of Teba (1696-1771), son of the 12th Countess
María Francisca de Sales Portocarrero de Guzmán y Zúñiga, 16th Countess of Teba (1754-1808), grand-daughter of the 14th Countess
Eugenio de Palafox y Portocarrero, 17th Count of Teba (1773-1834), son of the 16th Countess
Cipriano de Palafox y Portocarrero, 18th Count of Teba (1784-1839), brother of the 17th Count
María Eugenia de Palafox y Kirkpatrick, 19th Countess of Teba, (1826-1920), daughter of the 18th Count
Eugenia María Fitz-James Stuart y Falcó, 20th Countess of Teba (1880-1962), great-granddaughter of the 17th Count
Carlos Alfonso de Mitjans y Fitz-James Stuart, 21st Count of Teba (1907-1997), son of the 20th Countess
Macarena de Mitjans y Verea, 22nd Countess of Teba (1936-2020), daughter of the 21st Count
Jaime Patiño y Mitjans, 23rd Count of Teba (b. 1960), son of the 22nd Countess

See also
House of Guzmán

References

Bibliography
 
 

Spanish noble titles